The Compilation may refer to:

 The Compilation (20 Fingers album), 1995
 The Compilation (UTP album), 2002